Gorgyra rubescens, the rufous leaf sitter, is a butterfly in the family Hesperiidae. It is found in Nigeria (the Cross River loop), Cameroon, Gabon, the Republic of the Congo, the Central African Republic and the Democratic Republic of the Congo. The habitat consists of primary forests.

References

Butterflies described in 1896
Erionotini
Butterflies of Africa